Merom Golan is an Israeli settlement organized as a kibbutz in the Western Golan Heights. The settlement was established as a kibbutz after Israel occupied the area in the Six Day War in 1967. The international community considers Israeli settlements in the Golan Heights illegal under international law, but the Israeli government disputes this.

It is located at the bottom of the volcanic crater of Mount Bental. The settlement falls under the jurisdiction of Golan Regional Council.

History
Kibbutz Golan (later Merom Golan) was established on 14 July 1967 with funds from the Upper Galilee Regional Council on the site of the abandoned military camp of Aleika.

The kibbutz had the lowest temperature ever recorded by an Israeli weather station: -14.2°C. The previous record was -13.7C in the Beit Netofa Valley.

Geography

Climate

See also
Israeli-occupied territories
Status of territories occupied by Israel in 1967

References

External links

Official website

Israeli settlements in the Golan Heights
Kibbutzim
Populated places established in 1967
Golan Regional Council
Populated places in Northern District (Israel)
1967 establishments in the Israeli Military Governorate